Harmatz, also spelled Charmatz, Charmaz, Kharmatz, and Kharmaz is a Hebrew surname. Notable people with this surname include:

Joseph Harmatz (1925-2016), Lithuanian-born Jewish partisan fighter during World War II.
William Harmatz (1931-2011), American-born jockey

References  

Hebrew-language surnames